The Cal 39 is an American sailboat that was designed by C. William Lapworth as a racer-cruiser and first built in 1970. The boat was introduced just before the adoption of the International Offshore Rule (IOR) for racing and, as a consequence of not meeting that rule, saw low sales numbers. It was not in production long and was replaced by the Cal 39 Mark II.

Production
The design was built by Jensen Marine/Cal Yachts (Bangor Punta) in the United States. The company built 29 examples of the type starting in 1970 and ending in 1971, but it is now out of production.

Production of the design was cut short when first year sales did not match expectations, due to the boat not fitting the newly adopted IOR racing rules. It was replaced in the product line by the newly designed Cal 39 Mark II in 1978. The Mark II was later supplanted by the Cal 39 Mark III in 1983 and then the Cal 39 (Hunt/O'Day) in 1988. All four designs were sold as "Cal 39s".

Design
The Cal 39 is a recreational keelboat, built predominantly of fiberglass, with wood trim. It has a masthead sloop rig, a raked stem, a slightly raised counter reverse transom, a skeg-mounted rudder controlled by a wheel and a fixed fin keel. It displaces  and carries  of lead ballast. A tall rig was available, with a mast about  higher.

The boat is fitted with a British Perkins Engines 4108 diesel engine for docking and maneuvering.

See also
List of sailing boat types

Similar sailboats
Baltic 40
Corbin 39
Freedom 39
Freedom 39 PH
Islander 40
Nautical 39
Nordic 40

References

Keelboats
1970s sailboat type designs
Sailing yachts
Sailboat type designs by Bill Lapworth
Sailboat types built by Cal Yachts